Sukharevka is a rural locality (a village) in Korneyevsky Selsoviet, Meleuzovsky District, Bashkortostan, Russia. The population was 239 as of 2010. There is 1 street.

Geography 
Sukharevka is located 49 km north of Meleuz (the district's administrative centre) by road. Davletkulovo is the nearest rural locality.

References 

Rural localities in Meleuzovsky District
Sterlitamaksky Uyezd